The arbalest (also arblast) was a late variation of the crossbow coming into use in Europe during the 12th century. A large weapon, the arbalest had a steel prod (the "bow" portion of the weapon). Since the arbalest was much larger than earlier crossbows, and because of the greater tensile strength of steel, it had a greater force. However, the greater draw weight was offset by a shorter draw length, which limited the total potential energy that could be transferred into the crossbow bolt. A skilled arbalestier (arbalester) could loose two bolts per minute.

Nomenclature 
The term "arbalest" is sometimes used interchangeably with "crossbow". Arbalest is a Medieval French word originating from the Roman name  (from  'bow' +  'missile-throwing engine'), which was then used for crossbows, although originally used for types of artillery. Modern French uses the word , which is linguistically one step further from the stem (disappearance of the s phoneme in the last syllable, before the t).

The word applies to both crossbow and arbalest (the latter may be referred to as a heavy crossbow, but an actual heavy crossbow may not be the same as an arbalest). In some cases, the word has been used to refer to arbalists, the people who actually used the weapon.

References

Bibliography
 .
 

Crossbows
Medieval archery